The 1973 Davidson Wildcats football team represented Davidson College as a member of the Southern Conference (SoCon) during the 1973 NCAA Division I football season. Led by fourth-year head coach Dave Fagg, the Wildcats compiled an overall record of 2–8 with a mark of 1–6 in conference play, tying for seventh place in the SoCon.

Schedule

References

Davidson
Davidson Wildcats football seasons
Davidson Wildcats football